Theodo or Theodon is the name of two or more ancient Bavarian dukes:

Theodo I or Theodo IV
Theodo II or Theodo V

and the legendary:

Theodo I
Theodo II
Theodo III